Christopher M. Tuckett is a British biblical scholar and Anglican priest. He holds the Title of Distinction of Professor of New Testament Studies at the University of Oxford and is a Fellow of Pembroke College, Oxford.

Early life
Tuckett finished the Cambridge Mathematical Tripos (with first class honours in both parts 1 and 2) at Queens' College, Cambridge, and then took first class honours in both parts of the Cambridge Theology Tripos.

Career

Religious life
Tuckett was ordained a deacon in the Church of England in 1975 and priest a year later. He served for two years as assistant curate at the Priory Church in Lancaster, followed by two years as Chaplain and Bye-Fellow back at Queens'. Here he was awarded his doctoral degree for his dissertation "The Revival of the Griesbach Hypothesis: Analysis and Appraisal". The Griesbach hypothesis relates to the origins of the synoptic gospels.

Academic career
He was then lecturer in New Testament studies at the Victoria University of Manchester from 1979 until 1991 and Rylands Professor of Biblical Criticism and Exegesis until 1996. At Manchester, Tuckett served as Dean of the Faculty and Head of the newly formed Department of Religions and Theology. From Manchester, he moved to the University of Oxford where he was lecturer in New Testament Studies until 2001 before being awarded the Title of Distinction of Professor of New Testament Studies.

Tuckett was the President of the Studiorum Novi Testamenti Societas (SNTS), from 2013 to 2014.

Honours
 2011: New Studies in the Synoptic Problem, Oxford Conference, April 2008: Essays in Honour of Christopher M. Tuckett. Leuven: Peeters
 2012: Burkitt Medal by the British Academy 'in recognition of special service to Biblical Studies'.

Works

Books

Chapters
Mark in Barton, J. and Muddiman, J. (2001), The Oxford Bible Commentary.

As editor

Journal articles

References

External links
Christopher Tuckett's faculty pages

Living people
British biblical scholars
New Testament scholars
Alumni of Queens' College, Cambridge
Academics of the University of Manchester
Fellows of Pembroke College, Oxford
20th-century English Anglican priests
Fellows of Queens' College, Cambridge
21st-century English Anglican priests
Anglican biblical scholars
1948 births